Cesare Biagi (1 February 1932 – 29 April 2009) was an Italian sailor. He competed in the Tornado event at the 1976 Summer Olympics.

References

External links
 

1932 births
2009 deaths
Italian male sailors (sport)
Olympic sailors of Italy
Sailors at the 1976 Summer Olympics – Tornado
Sportspeople from Milan